Launceston, also known at some periods as Dunheved, was a parliamentary constituency in Cornwall which returned two Members of Parliament to the British House of Commons from 1295 until 1832, and one member from 1832 until 1918. It was a parliamentary borough until 1885, and a county constituency thereafter.

Boundaries
1832–1885: The old Borough of Launceston and the Parish of St Stephen, and all such parts of the several Parishes of Lawhitton, St Thomas the Apostle, and South Petherwin as are without the old Borough of Launceston.

1885–1918: The Sessional Division of East Middle, East North, Lesnewth, and Stratton, and part of the Sessional Division of Trigg.

History
Launceston was one of 21 parliamentary boroughs in Cornwall between the 16th and 19th centuries; unlike many of these, which had been little more than villages even when established and were rotten boroughs from the start, Launceston had been a town of reasonable size and importance though much in decline by the 19th century. The borough consisted of only part of the present town, as Newport was a separate borough in itself from 1554, though Newport and Launceston were joined as Dunheved, collectively returning members, earlier in that century.

The right to vote was vested theoretically in the Mayor, aldermen and those freemen of the borough who were resident at the time they became freemen; but in practice the vote was exercised only by members of the corporation, who were chosen mainly with a view to maintaining the influence of the "patron". Up to 1775, this was generally the head of the Morice family, who also controlled Newport, but in that year Humphry Morice sold his interest in both boroughs to the Duke of Newcastle, whose family retained hold on both until the Reform Act. There were about 17 voters in Launceston in 1831, by which time the borough was as rotten as any of the others in Cornwall.

In 1831 the borough had a population of 2,669 and 429 houses. Under the Great Reform Act of 1832 the boundaries were extended to encompass the whole town (including Newport, which was abolished as a separate borough), bringing the population up to 5,394. This was sufficient for Launceston to retain one of its two seats.

The borough was eventually abolished in 1885, but the name of the town was transferred to the new county constituency in which it was placed, strictly the North-Eastern or Launceston Division of Cornwall, which also elected a single member. This covered a much larger, rural, area including Callington, Calstock and Bude-Stratton. This constituency in its turn was abolished in 1918, being absorbed mostly into the new Cornwall North constituency.

Members of Parliament

Launceston borough

MPs 1295–1629

 Constituency created (1295)

MPs 1640–1832

MPs 1832–1885

North-Eastern or Launceston Division of Cornwall

MPs 1885–1918

Elections

Elections in the 1830s

Gordon resigned, causing a by-election.

Elections in the 1840s

Hardinge was appointed Secretary at War, requiring a by-election.

Hardinge resigned after being appointed Governor-General of India, causing a by-election.

Elections in the 1850s

Elections in the 1860s

Campbell resigned, causing a by-election.

Elections in the 1870s

The election was declared void on petition, due to corrupt practices including Deakin allowing his tenants to "kill rabbits the eve of the election", causing a by-election.

Deakin's resignation caused a by-election.

Elections in the 1880s 

Giffard resigned upon his appointment as Lord Chancellor and elevation to the peerage, becoming Lord Halsbury, causing a by-election.

Elections in the 1890s

Elections in the 1900s

Elections in the 1910s 

General Election 1914/15:

Another General Election was required to take place before the end of 1915. The political parties had been making preparations for an election to take place and by the July 1914, the following candidates had been selected; 
Liberal: George Marks
Unionist: Edward Treffry

Notes

References

 D. Brunton & D. H. Pennington, Members of the Long Parliament (London: George Allen & Unwin, 1954)
Cobbett's Parliamentary History of England, from the Norman Conquest in 1066 to the year 1803 (London: Thomas Hansard, 1808) 
 F. W. S. Craig, British Parliamentary Election Results 1832–1885 (2nd edition, Aldershot: Parliamentary Research Services, 1989)
 Maija Jansson (ed.), Proceedings in Parliament, 1614 (House of Commons) (Philadelphia: American Philosophical Society, 1988)
 J. E. Neale, The Elizabethan House of Commons (London: Jonathan Cape, 1949)
 J. Holladay Philbin, Parliamentary Representation 1832 – England and Wales (New Haven: Yale University Press, 1965)
 Henry Stooks Smith, The Parliaments of England from 1715 to 1847, Volume 1 (London: Simpkin, Marshall & Co, 1844)  
 
 Frederic A. Youngs, jr, "Guide to the Local Administrative Units of England, Vol I" (London: Royal Historical Society, 1979)
 House of Commons journals and other records at British History Online
  The History of Parliament Trust, Launceston (Dunheved), Borough from 1386 to 1868
 

Parliamentary constituencies in Cornwall (historic)
Constituencies of the Parliament of the United Kingdom established in 1295
Constituencies of the Parliament of the United Kingdom disestablished in 1918
Rotten boroughs
Launceston, Cornwall